Fairfield High School for Girls, is an all-girls' secondary academy located in Droylsden, Greater Manchester.

Admissions
There are around 950 girls and over 50 teachers.

According to the school's website the ethos is strong and traditional, and the website also claims a commitment to academic success for its girls, including high standards of behaviour and appearance. The current Headmaster is Mrs Steph Bateman, following the retirement of Mr Hesketh.

It is situated between the A662 and A635 in Fairfield. The M60 is less than a mile away to the east. Fairfield Avenue is accessed via the A635 to the south.

History
It was established in 1796 by Mary Tyrrell and the Moravian Church, a Protestant organisation which originates in the 15th century, with just 21 girls and 6 teachers. Thus, it has been providing inclusive girls' education for over 200 years.

Grammar school
It was a girls' high school, based at The Square. There were plans in 1965, by the divisional executive (for the Tameside area), for it to become a sixth form college, to come into operation by 1967. The Lancashire Education Committee never approved the plan. It was administered by the Borough of Tameside from April 1974.

Comprehensive
In 1975 the headmistress, Miss Ruth Gleave, resigned and became head of Bradford Girls' Grammar School (which became an independent school at the same time) in Bradford, just before the school became comprehensive in 1979. The school lost its sixth form.

The school was Grant Maintained between 1993 and 1999. It then became a Foundation School and became a Specialist Science College in September 2004.

Academy
The school converted to an Academy school on 1 April 2011.

Significant staff changes
Mr Howell, Deputy Headteacher, retired in 2008. He joined the school in January 1984 in the position of Head of Science. After a short time in post, Mr Howell's responsibilities were extended and he led a new initiative, the Technical and Vocational Educational Initiative (TVEI). Mr Howell was later promoted to the Senior Leadership Team. Shortly afterwards, he was promoted to the position of Head of Upper School (including responsibility for Years 10 and 11), and then he became Deputy Headteacher, working with the ex-Headteacher Mr Penter.

Extra-curricular activities
The school hosts a number of extra-curricula activities, including:
~ The Debating Society.
~ Y7 Circle Time.
~ Choir.
~ Band.
~ Volleyball.
~ Lacrosse.
~ Drama Group.
~ Eco Schools Group.
~ Young Enterprise Group.
~ Computer Club 4 Girls.
~ Design Technology Workshop.
~ Chess Club.
~ Manga Club

Expanding opportunities
They are now offering pupils the chance to study for extra qualifications outside their normal study. For example:
~ Critical Thinking AS Level.
~ Religious Studies GCSE Full Course on Sikhism.
~ Spanish GCSE.
~ Microsoft Office Specialist Certificates.
~ Additional Maths
~ Twilight Courses

The school has a virtual learning space offering pupils help and guidance at home. Virtual Learning Zone

Academic performance
The school was ranked second in Tameside in the 2010 school results league table St Thomas More RC College (a mixed school), and 11% above the national average. Tameside GCSE results are more reasonable than many parts of Greater Manchester. The school was graded 1 (outstanding) by Ofsted in its most recent report.

Alumni
The school retains strong links with its alumni through the Old Girls' Association.

The group hold two meetings each year, one in the spring and a second in the autumn. These meetings are open to all ex-pupils and offer an opportunity to meet up with old friends in the school hall, with refreshments, whilst raising money for a charity.

Droylsden Fairfield High School
 Diana Cavanagh, Director of Education for Bradford from 1996–2001
 Shirley Stelfox, actress
 Prof Anne Tattersfield OBE, Professor of Respiratory Medicine from 1984–2005 at the University of Nottingham, President from 2000-01 of the British Thoracic Society
 Laurie Wood, née Brown, Professor of Academic Enterprise at Salford University
 Kay Freeman, née Jackson, deputy director of USAID agency.
 Brooke Vincent, Actress, best known for Coronation Street
 Georgia Taylor-Brown, Olympic Triathlete
 Ellie Leach, Actress, best known for Coronation Street

References

External links
 Official website
 History of the area
 EduBase

Girls' schools in Greater Manchester
Educational institutions of the British Province of the Moravian Church
Educational institutions established in 1796
1796 establishments in England
Secondary schools in Tameside
Academies in Tameside
Droylsden